Commotria invenustella is a species of snout moth in the genus Commotria. It was described by Carlos Berg in 1885. It is found in Argentina and Uruguay.

References

Moths described in 1885
Anerastiini